The middleweight competition was the fourth-highest weight class featured in amateur boxing at the 2008 Summer Olympics, and was held at the Workers Indoor Arena,   Beijing China. Middleweights were limited to a maximum of 75 kilograms in body mass.

Like all Olympic boxing events, the competition was a straight single-elimination tournament. Both semifinal losers are awarded bronze medals, so no boxers compete again after their first loss. Bouts consist of four rounds of two minutes each, with one-minute breaks between rounds. Punches are scored only if the white area on the front of the glove makes full contact with the front of the head or torso of the opponent. Five judges score each bout; three of the judges have to signal a scoring punch within one second for the punch to score. The winner of the bout is the boxer who scores the most valid punches by the end of the bout.

Medalists

Draw
All times are China Standard Time (UTC+8)

See also
2009 World Amateur Boxing Championships – Middleweight

External links 
 AIBA
 Results

Boxing at the 2008 Summer Olympics